Ida Schöpfer (22 October 1929 – 7 June 2014) was a Swiss alpine skier, ten times Swiss champion in alpine skiing and 1954 World Champion in Downhill skiing and Alpine combined. She competed in the 1952 Winter Olympics, but did not achieve a medal. Ida Schöpfer then became the first woman to be elected Swiss Sportsman of the Year in 1954. The Flühli Ski Club organized a "World Cup Week" in her honor in 2004, during which documents and objects were exhibited and Karl Erb and Bernhard Russi, among others, took part. Ida Schöpfer died in her hometown of Flühli in June 2014 at the age of 84.

References

1929 births
2014 deaths
Swiss female alpine skiers
Olympic alpine skiers of Switzerland
Alpine skiers at the 1952 Winter Olympics
20th-century Swiss women